Jan Cornelisz Lichthart (died 30 November 1646), also known as Johan or Johannes Lichthart, was a Dutch admiral in the service of the Dutch West India Company. He distinguished himself as a buccaneer, attacking Spanish and Portuguese fleets and forts in the Caribbean and South America, particularly along the coast of present-day Brazil.

Lichthart, who had lived in Lisbon and spoke Portuguese, played a major part in the Dutch struggle against the Portuguese for possession of Brazil from 1630 onwards (see further Dutch Brazil). For instance, a squadron under his command conquered São Luis do Maranhão from the Portuguese in 1641. And at Tamandaré on September 9, 1645, a squadron under his command destroyed a Portuguese squadron under the command of Jerônimo Serrão de Paiva.

In 1630, he defeated a squadron of three Dunkirker ships following a pitched eight-hour battle.

He died on 30 November 1646 in Brazil, near the São Francisco River, after "drinking cold water when he was much heated."

References 

1646 deaths
Admirals of the navy of the Dutch Republic
Dutch people of the Eighty Years' War (United Provinces)
Naval commanders of the Eighty Years' War
Dutch privateers
Sailors on ships of the Dutch West India Company
Year of birth unknown